The 2017 FA Women's Cup Final was the 47th final of the FA Women's Cup, England's primary cup competition for women's football teams. The showpiece event was the 24th to be played directly under the auspices of the Football Association (FA) and was named the SSE Women's FA Cup Final for sponsorship reasons. The final was contested between Birmingham City Ladies and Manchester City Ladies on 13 May 2017 at Wembley Stadium in London. The match was the third FA Women's Cup Final to be held at Wembley and attracted a record crowd (35,271) for a Women's Cup final.

Match

Details

References

Cup
Women's FA Cup finals
FA Women's Cup Final
FA Women's Cup Final
FAC 2017